Make Way for Love is the second studio album by New Zealand musician Marlon Williams. It was released 16 February 2018.

Production
The album was recorded with Grammy-winning producer Noah Georgeson at Panoramic Studios in California, USA.

Release
On 8 November 2017, Williams announced the release of his second studio album, along with the single "Nobody Gets What They Want Anymore".

Critical reception
Make Way for Love was met with "universal acclaim" reviews from critics. At Metacritic, which assigns a weighted average rating out of 100 to reviews from mainstream publications, this release received an average score of 82 based on 14 reviews. Aggregator Album of the Year gave the release a 79 out of 100 based on a critical consensus of 13 reviews.

James Christopher Monger of AllMusic explained "Written in the wake of a breakup with fellow Kiwi crooner Aldous Harding, the 11-track set is awash in post-midnight reverb and spilling over with the myopic despondency of heartbreak." Hal Horowitz of American Songwriter noted "singer-songwriter Marlon Williams creates a lasting, durable and above all emotionally poignant work that makes the inherent self-doubt, confusion and frustration of his split feel universal and distinctive."

Accolades

Track listing

Charts

Certification

References

2018 albums
Dead Oceans albums
Marlon Williams (New Zealand musician) albums